The 6th Guards Order of Red Banner Tank Army was a tank army of the Soviet Union's Red Army, first formed in January 1944 as the 6th Tank Army, and disbanded in Ukraine in the 1990s after the dissolution of the Soviet Union. During its service in World War II, the army was commanded by Lieutenant General of Tank Troops (later Colonel General) Andrei Kravchenko.

World War II 
Initially commanding the 5th Mechanised Corps and the 5th Guards Tank Corps, the 6th Tank Army's first major operation was the suppression of the Korsun-Cherkassy Pocket in January–February 1944. It then fought in the Iassy-Kishinev Offensive during August 1944 before gaining a Guards title in September 1944. Under its new title, it was soon engaged in the Battle of Debrecen on the 2nd Ukrainian Front, before fighting against the Germans during Operation Frühlingserwachen in March 1945. Pushing west, the tank army moved south of Vienna, Austria and pivoted to the north in a wide encircling maneuver that cut Vienna off from the rest of the German Reich. At the end of the war, one of its subordinate formations, the 2nd Guards Mechanised Corps, ended operations in the area of Benešov, Czechoslovakia, on 9 May 1945.

The 6th Guards Tank Army was then moved to the Transbaikal Military District in order to take part in the Soviet invasion of Manchuria. The army, under the command of Colonel General Andrei Kravchenko spearheaded the Transbaikal Front's offensive against the Japanese Kwantung Army on 9 August 1945. The 6th Guards Tank Army consisted of the 5th Guards Tank Corps, and 7th and 9th Guards Mechanised Corps, and many smaller formations, in all, a total of 1,019 tanks and self-propelled guns. For this operation, the tank army was restructured such that the infantry, artillery, and armored components were much more balanced than they had been during the war against the Germans. This was the first example of what proved to be the standard Soviet mechanized army organization during the Cold War. During the Soviet invasion of Manchuria, the Army was operating as part of the Transbaikal Front, and during the Khingano-Mukden Operation, the Army was tasked to advance 800 kilometers.

Cold War 

It was stationed in Mongolia, reporting to the Transbaikal Military District, for 15 years after the war. It still included the 5th Guards Tank Division (First Formation, "Stalingrad-Kiev").

The friendship with China of those days and the Nikita Khrushchev military reductions changed the fate of the Army, and in 1959 it was relocated to Dnipropetrovsk (now Dnipro) in the Kyiv Military District. 22nd Guards Tank Division joined the army in 1957. Toward the end of the 1980s it appears to have retained four Guards Tank Divisions – the 17th, 42nd (the former 42nd Guards Rifle Division) and the 75th (formerly the 75th Guards Rifle Division, plus the 22nd Guards Tank Division (disbanded September 1990).

On 11 November 1990, following the disbandment of the 22nd and the 75th Guards Tank Divisions, the reorganisation of the 42nd Guards Tank Division as the 6299th Base for Storage of Weapons and Equipment, and the arrival of the 93rd Guards Motor Rifle Division from the Southern Group of Forces, the Army had on hand 462 main battle tanks, all T-64s, 228 BMPs and BTRs, 218 other pieces of equipment of various types, including the surface-to-surface missiles of the 107th Rocket Brigade at Kremenchug, and five helicopters (with the 16th Separate Mixed Aviation Squadron at Podgorodnoe).

Ukrainian service 
After the dissolution of the Soviet Union it became part of the Ukrainian Ground Forces. In March 1992 Major General Volodymyr Shkidchenko returned home to become the army's commander. He was promoted to Lieutenant General by Edict 642/92 of 31 December 1992. Shkidchenko was released from command of the 6th Guards Tank Army by Presidential Edict No. 220/93 June 19, 1993, to be appointed to another post. The first reference to the 6th Army Corps, the successor formation, appears in Ukaz N 350/93 of the President of Ukraine on 21 August 1993. Thus it appears the 6th Guards Tank Army was disbanded by redesignation sometime between June and August 1993.

The 6th Army Corps was based at Dnipropetrovsk and consisted of several brigades, including the 17th Armored Brigade and the 93rd Mechanized Brigade. It was disbanded in 2013.

Commanders 
The army was commanded by the following officers during its existence.
 Colonel General Andrei Kravchenko (20 January 1944  June 1947)
 Lieutenant General Vladimir Zhdanov (June 1947  30 April 1949)
 Lieutenant General Ivan Dremov (30 April 1949  27 February 1958)
 Lieutenant General Evgeniy Fominykh (27 February 1958  May 1960)
 Lieutenant General Gennady Obaturov (May 1960  13 July 1966)
 Lieutenant General Vladimir Makarov (13 July 1966  13 June 1969)
 Lieutenant General Gennady Zakharov (13 June 1969  26 February 1971)
 Lieutenant General Pyotr Shkidchenko (26 February 1971 17 August 1973)
 Lieutenant General Yuriy Terentev (17 August 1973  May 1978)
 Lieutenant General Vladimir Osipov (May 1978  6 January 1981)
 Lieutenant General Valery Sokolov (6 January 1981  December 1983)
 Lieutenant General Sergey Karsakov (December 1983  September 1985)
 Lieutenant General Vladlen Tsvetkov (September 1985  May 1988)
 Lieutenant General Valentin Boriskiy (May 1988  July 1989)
 Colonel General Vasily Sotkov (July 1989  2 May 1991)
 Lieutenant General Vitaly Radetsky (3 May 1991  April 1992)

Notes

References
Feskov et al., The Soviet Army in the Period of the Cold War, Tomsk University Press, 2004
David M. Glantz, Companion to Colossus Reborn, Lawrence: University Press of Kansas, 2005. .
David M. Glantz, When Titans Clashed, Lawrence: University Press of Kansas, 1995. .

Tank armies of the Soviet Union
Armies of Ukraine
Military units and formations established in 1943
Military units and formations disestablished in 1993
Guards Armies